ISIRTA songs are the songs, listed in alphabetical order, which were featured in episodes of the British comedy radio series I'm Sorry, I'll Read That Again.

The songs were written by Bill Oddie unless specified otherwise.

Songs

Aardvark, Ferret, Vulture
 sung by John Cleese (main) cast (Chorus)
 Play: "A Fairy Tale"

Baby Go To Sleep
(Lullaby)
 sung by Bill Oddie
 Play: "The Curse of the Flying Wombat" – part 9

Baby Samba
 sung by Bill Oddie
 Play:

Blimpht
 sung by Bill Oddie
 Plays: "Robin Hood" / "The Curse of the Flying Wombat" (record)

Bounce
 sung by Bill Oddie
 Play: "Robinson Prunestone"

Cactus In My Y-Fronts
 sung by Bill Oddie (with Graeme Garden as the "Yodelling Coyote")
 Play: "Jack the Ripper"

Cricket Tranquiliser
 sung by Bill Oddie
 Play: "The Lone Stranger"

Denmark Street
 sung by Bill Oddie
 Play: Professor Prune & The Electric Time Trousers -part 13

Favourite Melody (Beethoven's Fifth)
 sung by Bill Oddie
 Plays: "The Curse of the Flying Wombat" – part 4 / "William the Conqueror"

The Ferret Song
 Songwriters: John Cleese and Graham Chapman
 Introduction by David Hatch
 sung by John Cleese (and Gang – alias: "The Lovin' Pruneful")
 Comment by Tim Brooke-Taylor
 Play: "The Curse of the Flying Wombat" – part 1

The Ferrets of Old England
 Introduction by David Hatch
 sung by Bill Oddie (and Gang)
 Comment by Tim Brooke-Taylor
 Play: "The Curse of the Flying Wombat" – part 8

Ferry Across the Mersey
(Liverpudlian Love Song)
 sung by Bill Oddie
 Play: "Liverpool the City"

Hey There, You With the Tzar in Your Pies
 sung by Bill Oddie
 Play: "Dr. Zhivago and His Wonderful Lamp"

Hovercraft Ride
 sung by Bill Oddie
 Play: Professor Prune & The Electric Time Trousers - part 2

I Love a Show (Footlights)
 sung by Bill Oddie (and Gang)
 Comments by Tim Brooke-Taylor and John Cleese
 Spoon playing and tap dancing: John Cleese
 Play: "The Curse of the Flying Wombat" – part 13

I Love Youooo
(Yippee)
 sung by Jean Hart and Bill Oddie
 Play: "RAF Briefing"

Identikit Gal
 sung by Bill Oddie
 Plays: "Robin Hood" / "The Curse of the Flying Wombat" (special)

I'm Gonna Live
 sung by Bill Oddie
 Play: "All Hands on Venus"

I'm Lenin on a Lamp-post at the Corner of the Street
 sung by Bill Oddie
 Play: "Dr. Zhivago and His Wonderful Lamp"

In the Moonlight
(Portuguese Dictionary Song)
 sung by Bill Oddie
 English translations by John Cleese
 Play: "The Ghost of Objectionable Manor"

In the Old Bazaar in Cairo
 sung by Graeme Garden and Bill Oddie
Play: "Search for the Nile"

Ironing My Goldfish
 sung by Bill Oddie
 Play: Tales Of The Circus

It's Spring
 sung by Bill Oddie
 Play: "Champion the Wonder Mouse"

I've Got the Hiccups
 sung by
 Play: "The Curse of the Flying Wombat" – part 10

Joke Song
 sung by Bill Oddie (with the other joke by John Cleese)
 Play: "Othello"

Julie Andrews
 sung by Bill Oddie
 Play: "Operation 'Chocolate'"

Just One of Those Things
 sung by Bill Oddie
 Play: "Ali Baba and the 38 Thieves"

Keep Fit Class
 sung by
 Plays: History – 10,000 B.C. / Liverpool the City

Knitting
 sung by Bill Oddie
 Play: "Catermole Sharp and Dr. Gaskit" (Sherlock Holmes)

Let There Be
 sung by
 Play: "Dr. Why and the Thing"

Liverpool Girl
 sung by Bill Oddie
 Play: "Liverpool the City"

The Masochism Song
 sung by Bill Oddie
 Play: "Moll Flanders"

Magical Mystery Four: I Am the Milkman
(Beatles send-up)
 sung by 
 Play: "Bunny and Claude"

Man's Best Friend – a Dog
 sung by Bill Oddie
 Play: "Butler Dunnit"

Man's Best Friend – a Duck
 sung by Bill Oddie
 Play: "The Curse of the Flying Wombat" – part 11

Meet Me in the Churchyard, Nellie
 sung by Bill Oddie
 Play: "The Supernatural"

My Baby's Become a Folk Singer
 sung by Bill Oddie
 Play: "Robin Hood"

My Mom Has Lost My Dad
 sung by Bill Oddie
 Play: "The Curse of the Flying Wombat" – part 2

Nuclear Submarine
 sung by Bill Oddie, David Hatch, Graeme Garden and Tim Brooke-Taylor
 Play: "Dr. Why and the Thing"

On Ilkla' Moor Baht 'At
 sung by Bill Oddie
 Play: Professor Prune & The Electric Time Trousers - part 3

Police Constable Herbert Platt, Somerset Constabulary – Greatest Lawman of Them All
 sung by Bill Oddie
 P. C. Herbert Platt: John Cleese
 Play: "Julius Caesar"

Protect My Honey On Her Journey: Send Her by Post
 sung by Bill Oddie
 Play: "England Our England (Learning to Fly)"

Recorded 'Live in Cabaret
(in the Cafe "Ole")
 Introduction by David Hatch
 sung by Bill Oddie
 Night Club Compere: Tim Brooke-Taylor
 Recording Artist: Bill Oddie
 The four Diners: John Cleese, David Hatch, Tim Brooke-Taylor and Jo Kendall
 Play: "The Curse of the Flying Wombat" – part 5

Reminiscences (Nappy Days)
 sung by Bill Oddie
 Play: "The Vikings"

Repeat After Me
 sung by
 Play: "William Tell"

Rhubarb Tart
 sung by Bill Oddie (and Gang)
 Play: "The Supernatural"

Rock With A Policeman
 sung by Bill Oddie
 Play:

She's Gone
 sung by Bill Oddie (and Gang) – with comment by Jean Hart)
 Play: "RAF Briefing"

The Ship Put to Sea in the Month of May
(Madrigal arrangement for four voices and Tim Brooke-Taylor)
 Songwriters: Eric Idle and John Cameron
Introduction by David Hatch
 sung by David Hatch, Bill Oddie, Graeme Garden, Jo Kendall and Tim Brooke-Taylor
 Play: "Julius Caesar"

Sick Man Blues
 sung by Graeme Garden, Bill Oddie and Tim Brooke-Taylor
 Play: "Star Trek"

Something About Restaurant Food
 sung by
 Play: "A Fairy Story"

Stop It, I Like It
 sung by Bill Oddie
 Play: "Angus Prune, Footballer"

Take It Off
(dieting)
 sung by 
 Play: "Tim Brown's Schooldays"

Taking My Oyster For Walkies
 Introduction by David Hatch
 sung by Bill Oddie (and Gang)
 Play: "Dentisti"

Telephone Directory
 sung by
 Play: "Voyages of Ulysses"

The Terrapin Song
 sung by Bill Oddie
 Play: "Laurence of the Antarctic – On Ice"

Trio Los Banditos
 sung by Bill Oddie, Tim Brooke-Taylor and Graeme Garden
 Chief Bandito (on guitar) – Graeme Garden
 Jose (on bongo drums) – Tim Brooke-Taylor
 Manuel (on maracas) – Bill Oddie
 Play: "Incompetence"

Waiter, there's a Walrus in My Soup
 Introduction by David Hatch
 sung by Bill Oddie
 Play: "Camelot"

Waiting for the London Bus (spiritual)
 sung by Bill Oddie, Tim Brooke-Taylor, Graeme Garden and David Hatch
 Play: "England Our England (Learning to Fly)"

We're Going to a Football Match
 sung by Bill Oddie
 Play: "Teddy and Rupert Bear"

What a Wonderful World
 sung by Bill Oddie (a la Louis Armstrong)
(including tonsillectomy)
 Concerned friends – Tim Brooke-Taylor and David Hatch
 Doctor – John Cleese
 Nurse – Jo Kendall
 Play: "Macbeth"

When You Wish Upon a Star
 sung by Bill Oddie and Jo Kendall
 Play: "Star Trek"

When You Wish Upon a Tzar
 sung by Bill Oddie
 Play: "Dr. Zhivago and His Wonderful Lamp"

Where Is My Smile
 sung by Bill Oddie
 Play: "The Curse of the Flying Wombat" – part 3

Why Can't the Animals
 sung by
 Play: "The Inimitable Grimbling"

With a Girl Like You: Wild Things
 sung by Bill Oddie
 comment by David Hatch
 Play: "The Curse of the Flying Wombat" – part 6

Working on the Railroad
 sung by Bill Oddie
 Play: "The Curse of the Flying Wombat" – part 7

Yodelling Goatherd
 sung by Bill Oddie, Tim Brooke-Taylor, and the Cast
 Play: "The Curse of the Flying Wombat" – part 12

External links
Index to programmes: http://www.britishcomedy.org.uk/comedy/isirta.html

I'm Sorry, I'll Read That Again